Toothpick Lake is a lake in Kenora District, Ontario, Canada. The primary inflow is Wonderland Creek, and the primary outflow is an unnamed creek to Grassy Narrows Lake on the English River.

See also
List of lakes in Ontario

References

Lakes of Kenora District